
Gmina Płośnica is a rural gmina (administrative district) in Działdowo County, Warmian-Masurian Voivodeship, in northern Poland.

The gmina contains part of the protected area called Wel Landscape Park.

Villages
Gmina Płośnica contains the villages and settlements of Gralewo, Gródki, Gruszka, Jabłonowo, Mały Łęck, Murawki, Niechłonin, Płośnica, Prioma, Przełęk Duży, Rutkowice, Skurpie, Turza Mała, Wielki Łęck and Zalesie.

Neighbouring gminas
Gmina Płośnica is bordered by the gminas of Działdowo, Kuczbork-Osada, Lidzbark and Rybno.

References

Polish official population figures 2006

Plosnica
Działdowo County